Juan Manuel García (born 14 November 1992) is an Argentine professional footballer who plays as a forward for Newell's Old Boys.

Career
García had youth spells with Gimnasia y Esgrima, Independiente, Santamarina and Banfield. He was loaned out in 2013 to Primera B Nacional side Brown, with his Brown and professional debut coming in a league defeat to Douglas Haig on 1 September 2013. Four matches later, García scored the first goal of his career in a 3–3 draw with Unión Santa Fe. He scored two goals in a game for the first time on 2 April 2014 in the Copa Argentina vs. Villa Cubas. Brown were relegated in 2013–14, while Banfield were promoted as champions. He remained with Brown in Primera B Metropolitana for two seasons.

In the first, 2014, he scored once in eighteen matches, but then scored eleven times in thirty-seven games in 2015. He scored in his final Brown appearance of 2015, netting a 94th-minute winner against Deportivo Morón which confirmed the club as title winners. In January 2016, García joined San Martín of the Primera División on loan. However, he returned to Banfield six months later after just one match for San Martín; an appearance in the Copa Argentina versus Instituto. He subsequently rejoined Brown on loan in July 2016. He scored two goals in his first four appearances back with Brown.

He returned to Banfield on 31 July 2017 and was subsequently loaned out again, this time to Ferro Carril Oeste. He scored in his eighth appearance, versus former club Brown; scoring the first goal in a 2–2 draw. García completed a move to Arsenal de Sarandí of Primera B Nacional in July 2018, subsequently netting on his league debut against Gimnasia y Esgrima (J) on 25 August. In two seasons with the club, which included promotion in 2018–19, the forward scored ten goals in thirty appearances in all competitions. In August 2020, García moved across the Primera División to Unión Santa Fe.

On 26 January 2022, García joined Newell's Old Boys on a one-year deal.

Career statistics
.

Honours
Brown
Primera B Metropolitana: 2015

References

External links

1992 births
Living people
People from Tandil
Argentine footballers
Association football forwards
Argentine Primera División players
Primera Nacional players
Primera B Metropolitana players
Club Atlético Banfield footballers
Club Atlético Brown footballers
San Martín de San Juan footballers
Ferro Carril Oeste footballers
Arsenal de Sarandí footballers
Unión de Santa Fe footballers
Newell's Old Boys footballers
Sportspeople from Buenos Aires Province